Orchard Lake is a lake in Lakeville, Dakota County, in the U.S. state of Minnesota.

Orchard Lake was named for the wild groves of crab apple and wild plum that grew near this lake.

See also
List of lakes in Minnesota

References

Lakes of Minnesota
Lakes of Dakota County, Minnesota